Mount Natazhat is a high peak of the Saint Elias Mountains, of Alaska, United States, just west of the border with the Yukon Territory of Canada. It lies on the northern edge of the range, south of the White River and north of the Klutlan Glacier.
Mount Natazhat is a little-noticed peak; however it is a very large peak in terms of rise above local terrain.

The current standard route is that of the second ascent along the northeast ridge. This route was first climbed in 1996 by D. Hart, P. Barry, H. Hunt, and D. Lucey. It is moderately serious by Alaskan standards (Alaska Grade 3+), with some steep ice and corniced ridges.

Mount Natazhat is not often climbed due to its remote location and the fact that it is not a particularly high peak, especially by Alaskan standards. (Also, it is not even a fourteener.) In fact, the only mention of the peak in the complete Index of the American Alpine Journal is for the 1996 ascent noted above.


See also

List of mountain peaks of North America
List of mountain peaks of the United States
List of mountain peaks of Alaska
List of Ultras of the United States

References

External links

Mountains of Alaska
Saint Elias Mountains
Landforms of Copper River Census Area, Alaska
Wrangell–St. Elias National Park and Preserve
Mount Natazhat
Mountains of Unorganized Borough, Alaska